Rolf Storsveen (born 22 April 1959) is a former Norwegian biathlete. At the 1984 Olympics in Sarajevo, he won a silver medal with the Norwegian relay team consisting of Kjell Søbak, Odd Lirhus, and Eirik Kvalfoss. He also came in sixth place in the 20 km individual.  He also won silver in the relay in the World Championships in 1982 in Minsk.

References

1959 births
Living people
Norwegian male biathletes
Olympic biathletes of Norway
Olympic silver medalists for Norway
Biathletes at the 1984 Winter Olympics
Olympic medalists in biathlon
Biathlon World Championships medalists
Medalists at the 1984 Winter Olympics